Anders Ivar Sven Wijkman (born 30 September 1944 in Stockholm) is a Swedish politician (Swedish: Kristdemokraterna, KD) who was Member of the European Parliament from 1999 to 2009. As member of the European Parliament, he focused on issues related to climate change, environment, development cooperation and humanitarian affairs.
He is a member of the Christian Democrats, part of the European People's Party - European Democrats group.

He sat on the European Parliament's Committee on the Environment, Public Health and Food Safety. He was also a substitute for the Committee on Development, a member of the delegation to the ACP-EU Joint Parliamentary Assembly, and a substitute for the delegation for relations with the United States.

Anders has been a member of the Swedish parliament, secretary general of the Swedish Red Cross, and president of the International Red Cross Disaster Relief Commission. Anders Wijkman is Co-President of Club of Rome and the Tällberg Foundation, and is a member of the Royal Swedish Academy of Sciences.
He is also a councillor for the World Future Council.

Career
 University degree (1967)
 Secretary-General of the Swedish Red Cross (1979–1988) and the Swedish Society for Nature Conservation (1989–1991)
 Director-General of the Swedish Agency for Research Cooperation with Developing Countries (1992–1994)
 Ambassador, Ministry of Foreign Affairs (since 1998)
 Member of the Swedish Parliament (1971–1978)
 Vice-Chairman of Committee on Development and Cooperation (2002–2004)
 Assistant Secretary-General of united Nations and Policy Director of UNDP (1995–1997)
 Member of the Club of Rome
 Member of International Factor 10 Club
 Member of the World Academy of Art and Science
 Member of the Board of Lead International
 Member of the Board of the World Resources Forum
 Member of the Royal Swedish Academy of Sciences
 Member of the Royal Academy of Agriculture and Forestry, Sweden
 Chairman of the board of the National Museum of Natural History
 Chairman of the board of the ZERI Foundation
 Member of the European Parliament (1999–2009)
 Chair of the Governing Board of Climate-KIC since 2017
 Member of the board of Think-thank Tankesmedjan Global Utmaning

References

External links
 Official website
 European Parliament biography
 

1944 births
Living people
Christian Democrats (Sweden) politicians
Christian Democrats (Sweden) MEPs
MEPs for Sweden 2004–2009
Members of the Royal Swedish Academy of Agriculture and Forestry
Members of the Royal Swedish Academy of Sciences
Club of Rome members
Members of the Riksdag 1970–1973
Members of the Riksdag 1974–1976
Members of the Riksdag 1976–1979